Juan Antonio San Epifanio Ruiz (born 12 June 1959), most commonly known as "Epi", is a Spanish retired professional basketball player. He spent all of his club career playing with FC Barcelona. He was named the Mister Europa European Player of the Year in 1984, by the Italian basketball magazine Superbasket, and the Best European Player of the 1980s decade, by the French sports newspaper L'Équipe. He was named one of FIBA's 50 Greatest Players in 1991.

At the Opening Ceremony of the 1992 Barcelona Summer Olympic Games, he was honoured with being the last athlete to carry the Olympic torch, before handing it to the archer, Antonio Rebollo, who lit the fire in the cauldron, with an arrow. He was named one of the 50 Greatest EuroLeague Contributors in 2008. He became a FIBA Hall of Fame player in 2016. He is considered to be one of the greatest small forwards to ever play in Europe.

Early life and career
San Epifanio, known by almost everyone as simply, "Epi", grew up in Zaragoza, and began to play the sport of basketball in his native city. In 1973, Epi made his club debut with CN Helios, in the Spanish third division. However, his local club eventually rejected him. In 1974, FC Barcelona signed his older brother, Herminio, to a contract. Herminio then insisted that Epi would also join him at the club, and so the two moved to Barcelona. FC Barcelona's senior men's team head coach, Ranko Žeravica, gave Epi the opportunity to play with the club's youth teams.

Professional career

FC Barcelona
In 1977, Epi joined the senior men's team of FC Barcelona. He quickly became the team's lead player. He would eventually go on to lead FC Barcelona to break the long-lived dominance of Real Madrid in Spain. During his career with the club, his teammates included Nacho Solozábal, Juan de la Cruz, Audie Norris, Andrés Jiménez, and other well-known players.

In a total of eighteen seasons with FC Barcelona (1977–78 to 1994–95), he won the top-level Spanish League title seven times, as he won the 
LEB Primera División (1981, 1983), and the Liga ACB (1987, 1988, 1989, 1990, and 1995). He also won the Spanish King's Cup ten times (1978, 1979, 1980, 1981, 1982, 1983, 1987, 1988, 1991, and 1994), the FIBA Saporta Cup twice (1985 and 1986), the FIBA Korać Cup once (1987), and the FIBA Club World Cup once (1985). Although he reached the FIBA European Champions Cup (EuroLeague) Finals 3 times (1984, 1990, 1991), he never lifted the most important trophy in European-wide club basketball.

He was named the MVP of the FIBA Club World Cup's 1987 edition. His 54 points scored in a game against Joventut Badalona, in 1984, counts among his most memorable performances. It is the second best single-game scoring total ever in the history of the top-tier level Spanish league (since 1957), and the highest ever single-game scoring mark in the history of the Spanish Liga ACB (since 1983).

National team career
In 1979, Epi made his first appearance with the senior Spanish national team. With Spain's senior national team, he appeared in a total of 239 games, over a 15-year long period (1979–1994). He is in second place all-time in senior national team appearances for Spain (behind J. C. Navarro). He was also the first Spanish national team player that took part in four Summer Olympic Games, from the (1980 Moscow Summer Olympics, to the 1992 Barcelona Summer Olympics).

He was a silver Olympic medalist at the 1984 Los Angeles Summer Olympics, and a silver medalist at the EuroBasket 1983. He also won a bronze medal at the EuroBasket 1991.

Post-playing career
San Epifanio concluded his professional basketball playing career on 25 May 1995, as F.C. Barcelona won another Spanish League title. Since 2007, he has been a basketball color commentator with Canal+ Spain.

References

External links 
FIBA Profile
FIBA EuroLeague Profile
Spanish League Profile 
FIBA Hall of Fame Profile
Euroleague.net 50 Greatest EuroLeague Contributors Profile
Super Epi, a Spaniard with a Yugoslavian wrist
2016 Class of FIBA Hall of Fame: Juan Antonio San Epifanio

1959 births
Living people
Basketball players at the 1980 Summer Olympics
Basketball players at the 1984 Summer Olympics
Basketball players at the 1988 Summer Olympics
Basketball players at the 1992 Summer Olympics
FC Barcelona Bàsquet players
FIBA Hall of Fame inductees
Liga ACB players
Medalists at the 1984 Summer Olympics
Olympic basketball players of Spain
Olympic medalists in basketball
Olympic silver medalists for Spain
Small forwards
Spanish men's basketball players
1982 FIBA World Championship players
Basketball players from Barcelona
Sportspeople from Zaragoza
1986 FIBA World Championship players
1994 FIBA World Championship players